D-Alanine—D-serine ligase (VanC, VanE, VanG) is an enzyme with systematic name D-alanine:D-serine ligase (ADP-forming). This enzyme catalyses the following chemical reaction

 D-alanine + D-serine + ATP  D-alanyl-D-serine + ADP + phosphate

The product of this enzyme, D-alanyl-D-serine, can be incorporated into the peptidoglycan pentapeptide instead of the usual D-alanyl-D-alanine dipeptide.

References

External links 
 

EC 6.3.2